Valdimira da Silva Tavares is a São Toméan politician. She was the first female Minister of Agriculture and Rural Development and served from 2007 to 2008. Her successor, Ângela Viegas Santiago, was also a woman.

References

Year of birth missing (living people)
Living people
Government ministers of São Tomé and Príncipe
Women government ministers of São Tomé and Príncipe
21st-century women politicians
21st-century São Tomé and Príncipe politicians